Joan Lui (also known as Joan Lui - Ma un giorno nel paese arrivo io di lunedì) is a 1985 Italian musical-comedy film by Adriano Celentano. It was the fourth and the last films Celentano wrote, starred in and directed.

Plot
Joan Lui is a singer who has come from another world to condemn the hypocrisy and atrocities of the Western culture. When he arrives in Italy, he seeks to create a band composed of young and inexperienced musicians to better spread his message. After having exposed the deception of a major musical producer, Joan Lui disappears into thin air. Meanwhile, the world is plunged into a terrible apocalypse.

Cast
Adriano Celentano: Joan Lui
Claudia Mori: Tina Foster
Marthe Keller: Judy Johnson
Federica Moro: Emanuela Carboni
Edwin Marian: Cap. Arthur
Gian Fabio Bosco: Winston
Mirko Setaro: Musico
Rita Rusic: Temple singer
Haruhiko Yamanouchi: Jarak
Piero Nuti: Franky
Edoardo Romano: Prime Minister
Sal Borgese: Frank
Gino Cogliandro: Bartender
Francesco Salvi: Journalist
Romano Puppo: Assassin

Soundtrack
 L'uomo perfetto
 Sex without Love
 Il tempio
 Mistero
 Lunedì
 Qualcosa nascerà
 Splendida e nuda
 L'ora è guinta
 La prima stella

Production
The film was the center of a dispute between Mario and Vittorio Cecchi Gori and Celentano as the producers decided, a month after theatrical release, to replace the original cut with another version with a different editing and 30 minutes shorter.

Reception
The film was a box office bomb, grossing 7.3 billion lire at the Italian box office in spite of a budget of about 20 billion lire.

The film also received generally bad reviews. Morando Morandini described it as "an enormous music video based on visual shock, jam-packed with music, with some monumental sets and elaborate editing. A true festival of kitsch also on an ideological level". According to Paolo Mereghetti the film, "a personal reading of Christianity in musicals", "a personal delusion of omnipotence", and "a mock-apocalyptic madness that is just able to list the worst clichés of indifference".

References

External links

Joan Lui at Variety Distribution

Italian science fiction comedy films
Films directed by Adriano Celentano
1985 films
1980s musical comedy films
1980s science fiction comedy films
Italian musical comedy films
1980s Italian-language films
1980s Italian films